Georgine is a women’s ready-to-wear brand founded by the designers Georgine Ratelband and Chris Roshia in New York City.

History 
Georgine was launched by the fashion designer Georgine Ratelband with her partner Chris Roshia and was founded in 2014. Before completing her graduation from Istituto Europeo di Design in 2011, thesis-collection of Georgine was acquired by a boutique in Antwerp, Belgium. Georgine was presented at New York Fashion Week, and their designs have rated the pages of Women’s Wear Daily, W Magazine and Vogue Italia.

Shortly following the launch of the brand Ratelband was surprised to discover that Beyoncé wore one of her pieces on the red carpet during her husband Jay-Z’s Tidal X Event at Brooklyn’s Barclays Center. Since then Georgine has dressed numerous celebrities including: Lady Gaga, Zendaya, Jennifer Lopez, Cardi B, Demi Moore, Alicia Keys, Bella Hadid, Lena Dunham, The Kardashians, Tracey Ellis Ross, Mariah Carey, Patina Miller, Elizabeth Gilles, Sarah Rafferty, Victoria's Secret Models; Rosie Huntington-Whiteley, Romee Strijd, etc.

Collections 
Georgine Ratelband debuted their first runway collection for NYFW Fall 2014.
 2014: Georgine runway NYFW Fall 2014	
 2015 Georgine Fall 2015
 2016: Georgine fall 2016 runway
 2017: Georgine RTW Spring 2017
 2018: Georgine Spring 2018 RTW

See also 

 Fashion design
 Armani
 Alexander McQueen
 Haute couture

References

External links 
 

Fashion design
High fashion brands
Clothing brands of the United States
Haute couture
Fashion accessory brands
Clothing companies established in 2014
Design companies established in 2014
2014 establishments in New York City
Privately held companies based in New York City